Lisa Resch (4 October 1908 – 31 January 1949) was a German alpine skier.
She won the women's world downhill championship in 1938, and a silver medal in the 1936 Winter Olympics women's downhill event.

External links
FIS database record

1908 births
1949 deaths
German female alpine skiers
Olympic alpine skiers of Germany
Alpine skiers at the 1936 Winter Olympics
Medalists at the 1936 Winter Olympics
Olympic silver medalists for Germany